Kinley is a brand of still or carbonated water owned by The Coca-Cola Company and sold in many large European and Asian countries. Its carbonated forms are used for mixers, and also available in a variety of fruit flavors.

The Kinley brand is used by Coca-Cola for two types of drinks:
Packaged water
A carbonated water with a wide array of variants: tonic, bitter lemon, ginger ale, club soda and fruit flavored. Available in Austria, Bangladesh, Belgium, Bulgaria, Czech Republic, Denmark, El Salvador, Finland, France, Germany, Greece, Hungary, India, Israel, Italy, Lithuania, Luxembourg, Maldives, Moldova, Nepal, Netherlands, Norway, Pakistan, Poland, Romania, Slovakia, Sri Lanka, Sweden, Switzerland, Turkey, and Zambia.

Kinley Lemon was one of eight international soda flavors featured and available for tasting at Club Cool in Epcot, but was retired in October 2013.

Flavors
Apple
Club Soda
Cola
Bitter Grapefruit
Bitter Lemon
Bitter Orange
Bitter Rose
Tonic Water
Vanilla Cream
Virgin Mojito
Ginger Ale
Raspberry

References

Coca-Cola brands
Carbonated water
Drink mixers